The 2008 Team Speedway Junior European Championship was the 1st UEM Team Speedway Junior European Championship season. The Final took place on May 22 2008 in Florian Kapała Stadium in Rawicz, Poland. First edition Europeam Championship was won by Sweden team.

Results 
It was the first Championship title for Linus Eklöf (11 points in Final), Ludvig Lindgren (10 pts), Simon Gustafsson (9 pts), Linus Sundström (6 pts) and Niklas Larsson (0 heats).

In Semi Final 1 in Güstrow, Germany won Germany team (45 points). Second was Denmark (38 pts) and they were qualified also. Third was Croatia (28 pts) with Jurica Pavlic (the then Individual European Champion) who was the best rider in this meeting (18 points in 6 heats). Last was France (9 pts).

In Semi Final 2 in Wiener Neustadt, Austria won Sweden team (37 points). Second was Russia (31 pts) but they did not qualify because the 2nd team in SF1 Denmark had more points. Third Latvia (28 pts) and fourth Czech Republic (24 pts) did not-qualified also. The best rider in SF2 was Artem Laguta from Russia (15 points in 6 heats).

In the Final, Sweden team (36 points) beat Germany (29 pts), Denmark (28 pts) and Poland (26 pts). Champion title was won after 19th heat, when Lindgren beat German Erik Pudel. Silver medal for Germany was won after last heat, when Frank Facher was last, but Danish Patrick Hougaard took only one point. Poland lost chance for a bronze medal after the 19th heat: Dawid Lampart won, but Danish Simon Nielsen took one point. The best rider in Final was Maciej Janowski from Poland (15 points in 6 heats). Janowski won 2nd heat the best time (62.16 sek.).

Heat details

Semi-Final 1 
March 23, 2008
 Güstrow
Referee:
Jury President:

Semi-Final 2 
April 19, 2008 (2 pm)
 Wiener Neustadt
Referee:  Wojciech Grodzki
Jury President: None (FMNR Jury Member  Susanne Hüttinger)
 Austria team was replaced by Latvia team.

The Final 
2008-05-22 (5 pm.)
 Rawicz, Florian Kapała Stadium
Referee:  I. Darago
Jury President:  S. Lyatosinskyy
Attendance: 1,500
Beat Time: 62.16 - Maciej Janowski (POL) in 2nd heat

Heat after heat
 (62.75) Ekloef, Norgaard, Wölbert, Kajzer (E1)
 (62.16) Janowski, Facher, Gustafsson, Larsen
 (63.03) Pudel, Lindgren, Hougaard, Łopaczewski
 (64.97) Jakobsen, Dilger, Sundström, Miturski
 (63.56) Hougaard, Janowski, Sundström, Wölbert(E4)
 (63.93) Lindgren, Facher, Jakobsen, Kajzer (X)
 (63.19) Gustafsson, Miturski, Pudel, Norgaard
 (64.37) Ekloef, Larsen, Lampart, Dilger (E4)
 (62.61) Janowski, Gustafsson, Jakobsen, Petersen
 (63.53) Hougaard, Facher, Ekloef, Miturski
 (64.03) Sundström, Pudel, Larsen, Kajzer (E)
 (63.97) Wölbert, Lindgren, Janowski, Nielsen
 (65.31) Hougaard, Facher, Sundström(X), Łoaczewski (M)
 (63.44) Lampart, Wölbert, Lindgren, Larsen
 (64.66) Janowski, Ekloef, Pudel, Jakobsen
 (64.59) Wölbert, Hougaard, Gustafsson, Lampart
 (65.40) Nielsen, Kajzer, Sundström, Petersen (E4)
 (65.59) Wölbert, Gustafsson, Larsen, Lampart (X)
 (65.03) Lampart, Lindgren, Nielsen, Pudel
 (65.16) Janowski, Ekloef, Hougaard, Facher

References

 pzm.pl - UEM Calendar 2008
 pzm.pl - Allocation
 speedway.org

See also 
 2008 Team Speedway Junior World Championship
 2008 Individual Speedway Junior European Championship

2008
European Team Junior